Yuva Kumar is an Indian Motorcycle Rally Racer/Pilot. He was born in Chittor, Andhra Pradesh and raised in Bengaluru, Karnataka. He did his schooling and college education in Bangalore and Mysore.

Career 
Between 2005 and 2011, he was participating in stunt competitions, Hill Climb races and drag races. He used to be hired as a stunt rider for action sequences in several Kannada movies, short films and Kannada music videos.

During his races, he rode well showing promising skills, and was soon noticed by TVS Racing in 2012 and soon signed up with them under the Novice Category for Supercross and Dirt track racing. With convincing performances as a Rookie, he even started challenging expert riders for the top spot. TVS soon promoted him to the Indian Experts Category 2013 and in 2015, he was selected to participate in Indian National Rally Championship and Indian Cross Country Rallies.

In 2017 his contract at TVS Racing ended. Between 2017 and 2020, he raced as a privateer with some partial sponsors. In 2021 Hero MotorSports took note of his achievements and officially signed him up as a fully supported and sponsored Factory Rider in their National Team, where he races to this day.

Notable achievements

References

External links 

 Yuva Kumar wins East Zone leg Motorsports
 Yuva Kumar wins Redbull Ace of dirt
 Yuva Kumar- Instagram
 Team CEAT’s Yuva Kumar Grabs Podium at Maruti Suzuki Desert Storm Rally 2017
 Rally Sprint 2018 : Yuva Kumar emerged as the Fastest Rider
 Yuva Kumar Lead Day 1 Of Maruti Suzuki Dakshin Dare 2018

Living people
Indian motorcycle racers
People from Chittoor
Year of birth missing (living people)